Van der Woude is a Dutch toponymic surname meaning "from the forest". The dative form of the particle indicates that the first people carrying the name came from a place called Het Woud of De Woud(e) ("the forest"). Less common variants are Van der Wouden and Van der Woud. People with this name include:

Adriaan van der Woude (1930–2017), Dutch physicist
Elizabeth van der Woude (1657–1694), Dutch traveller and writer
John Vander Woude, American politician
Marc van der Woude (born 1960), Dutch jurist
René van der Wouden (born 1972), Dutch electronic musician
Willem van der Woude (1876–1974), Dutch mathematician

See also
Van der Woude syndrome, congenital disorder first described in 1954 by American physician Anne Van der Woude (?–?)
5916 van der Woude, main-belt asteroid, named after Jet Propulsion Laboratory Image Coordinator Jurrie van der Woude (1935–2015)

References

Dutch-language surnames
Dutch toponymic surnames
Surnames of Dutch origin